Joe Kane is an American author of two books and a journalist who writes for publications such as The New Yorker, National Geographic, and Esquire.

Kane's Running the Amazon (1989) is a first hand account of the only expedition ever to travel the entire 4,200-mile Amazon River from its source in Peru to the Atlantic Ocean, which took place between August 1985 and February 1986. The book is listed on Outside Magazines "25 Best Adventure Books of the Last 100 Years" and National Geographic's "The 100 Greatest Adventure Books of All Time".

In 1991, Kane traveled to Ecuador to learn about the Huaorani Indians and their struggles with international oil companies who were exploiting the Amazon with poor environmental practices such as setting off explosive charges, building new roads and oil rigs, and causing oil spills. Based on his experiences there he wrote Savages (1995).

Publications
Running the Amazon. Vintage, 1989.  - Vintage paperback re-print 1990, includes a brief afterword that provides updates on the lives of those in the book.
Savages. Vintage, 1995. .

References

External links
"Running the Amazon", by Joe Kane. Excerpts and photographs from the book.

Year of birth missing (living people)
Living people
American male journalists